Noordeinde is a Dutch placename, meaning "North end". It refers to several Dutch settlements:

Noordeinde, Gelderland
Noordeinde, Utrecht
Noordeinde, Zeeland
Noordeinde, Alkmaar, in North Holland
Noordeinde, Berkel en Rodenrijs, in South Holland
Noordeinde, Nieuwkoop, in South Holland
Noordeinde, Oostzaan, in North Holland

It also refers to a street in The Hague, and to the Noordeinde Palace located there.

See also 
 Zuideinde (disambiguation) ("south end")